The following lists events that happened during 1924 in South Africa.

Incumbents
 Monarch: King George V.
 Governor-General and High Commissioner for Southern Africa:
 Prince Arthur of Connaught (until 20 January).
 The Earl of Athlone (from 21 January).
 Prime Minister:
 Jan Smuts (until 29 June).
 J.B.M. Hertzog (from 30 June).
 Chief Justice: James Rose Innes.

Events

January
 21 – Alexander Cambridge, 1st Earl of Athlone is appointed the 4th Governor-General of the Union of South Africa.

March
 5 – The first one-day flight between Cape Town and Pretoria takes place.

June
 30 – J.B.M. Hertzog becomes the third Prime Minister of South Africa.

Unknown date
 The Taung Child is discovered.

Births
 23 February – Allan Cormack, South African-American physicist and 1979 Nobel Prize laureate. (d. 1998)
 14 July – Stephen Fry, Springbok rugby captain. (d. 2002) 
 26 July – Elias Motsoaledi, political activist. (d. 1994)
 8 September – Hazel Brooks, actress (d. 2002)
 28 November – Dennis Brutus, poet and anti-apartheid activist. (d. 2009)
 5 December – Robert Sobukwe, anti-apartheid activist. (d. 1978)

Deaths

Railways

Railway lines opened

 16 April – Free State – Wepener to Zastron, .
 19 April – Cape – Klipdale to Bredasdorp, .
 1 May – Transvaal – Balfour North to Grootvlei, .
 16 June – Cape – Pinelands to Langa, .
 24 July – Free State – Heilbron to Petrus Steyn, .
 10 September – Transvaal – Lydenburg to Steelpoort, .
 19 September – South West Africa – Gobabis Junction in Windhoek to Ondekaremba, .
 22 September – Transvaal – Naboomspruit to Singlewood, .
 3 November – Cape – Franklin to Kokstad, .
 4 November – Cape – Franklin to Matatiele, .
 14 November – Cape – Oudtshoorn to Calitzdorp, .
 15 December – Cape – Touws River to Kareevlakte, .
 15 December – Transvaal – Hercules to Schoemansville, .

Locomotives
 The first of six Class GC branchline 2-6-2+2-6-2 Garratt articulated locomotives.
 A single Class ES1 battery-powered shunting locomotive at the construction site of the Colenso power station.

References

South Africa
Years in South Africa
History of South Africa